David Spector may refer to:

 David L. Spector (born 1952), cell and molecular biologist
 David Avraham Spector (1955–2013), Dutch-born Israeli rabbi
 Dave Spector, American gaijin tarento (foreign TV personality) and TV producer who lives and works in Japan

See also
 Dave Specter (born 1963) U.S. guitarist
 Spector (disambiguation)